"Young Man, Old Man (You Ain't Better Than the Rest)" is a song recorded by Australian band The Dissociatives. The song was released in May 2004 as the second single from the band's self-titled studio album. "Young Man, Old Man (You Ain't Better Than the Rest)" peaked at number 46 on the Australian ARIA Charts.
 
At the APRA Music Awards of 2005, the song was nominated for song of the year.

Track listing
 "Young Man, Old Man (You Ain't Better Than the Rest)" - 4:04
 "Much Preferred Customers" (The Presets remix) - 4:28
 "Lifting the Veil from the Braille" (Ubin remix) - 5:00
 "Paris Circa 2007/08" (Hermitude Remix) - 4:04

Charts

Release history

References

 
2004 singles
2004 songs
Eleven: A Music Company singles
The Dissociatives songs
Songs written by Daniel Johns
Songs written by Paul Mac